Vijalpor is a city and a municipality in Navsari district in the Indian state of Gujarat.  The city is under Surat Metropolitan Region. The town is located at a distance of 7 km south of Navsari City off Udhana-Nasik Highway.

Demographics
 India census, Vijalpor had a population of 	81245 with 2nd most populated urban region in Navsari district after Navsari. Males constitute 54.666% of the population and females 45.333% with sex ratio of 829, one of lowest sex ratio in Navsari District and child sex ratio of 842 females per 1000 males . Vijalpor has an average literacy rate of 88.1%, higher than the national average of 59.5% and Gujarat's 79.4% , male literacy is 92.9%, and female literacy is 82.4%. In Vijalpor, 13% of the population is under 6 years of age.

References

Cities and towns in Navsari district